Brenda B. Jones (born October 24, 1959) is an American politician who served as a member of the Detroit City Council from 2006 to 2022, and as the president of the City Council from 2014 to 2022. She won the 2018 special election to succeed John Conyers following his resignation in December 2017, and was succeeded by Rashida Tlaib. She ran for the seat again in 2020, losing the Democratic primary to Tlaib by a wide margin.

Early life

Brenda B. Jones was born on October 24, 1959, in Birmingham, Alabama, and her family moved to Detroit, Michigan, during the Great Migration. She attended public schools in Detroit, where she graduated from Cass Technical High School and later received a Bachelor of Arts in psychology from Wayne State University. She also earned a Graduate certificate from Wayne State University.
Jones worked for Michigan Bell and was later elected as a union president of the Communications Workers of America Local 4004 in Detroit. She was appointed as an executive on the boards of the Detroit Economic Growth Corporation and the Detroit Transportation Commission.

Politics

Detroit City Council
In 2005, Jones was elected to the Detroit City Council after placing ninth in the general election where nine seats were available and was reelected in 2009, 2013, and 2017. In 2015, the council voted for her to serve as the President of the Detroit City Council with five voting in favor of her and four voting in favor of incumbent President Saunteel Jenkins.

Jones has said that she will not be seeking reelection in 2021.

U.S. House of Representatives

Elections

2018–2019 

On December 5, 2017, Representative John Conyers resigned after sexual harassment allegations were made against him and that he had secretly used taxpayer money to settle a harassment claim. A special election was called to replace Conyers and Jones narrowly won the Democratic primary for the special election–the real contest in this heavily Democratic, black-majority district. No Republican qualified to run, though any Republican challenger would have faced nearly impossible odds. Conyers had held the seat since 1965 (it had been numbered as the 1st from 1965 to 1993 and as the 14th from 1993 to 2013), and his lowest winning percentage was 77 percent.

However, in the Democratic primary for the general election, Jones was defeated by former state representative Rashida Tlaib. Prior to the general election, Jones filed to run as an independent write-in candidate, prompting criticism.

During the course of the election campaign, questions arose as to whether Jones could serve in her Detroit City Council post concurrently with serving in Congress, an unprecedented situation up to that point. An opinion by the Detroit Corporation Counsel, written in August 2018, stated that it was likely possible for Jones to legally serve in both capacities based on state law. The Counsel advised that the United States House Committee on Ethics be consulted to clarify federal and House rules.

In the November 6 special election, Jones won with 86.8 percent of the vote, facing only a Taxpayers Party candidate as opposition. On the same day, she received 633 votes in the regular election for a full two-year term.

Speaker Paul Ryan delayed swearing Jones in until November 29, after receiving guidance from the House Ethics Committee on how Jones could minimize conflicts of interest. She introduced two bills and cast 77 votes during her five-week tenure in the House of Representatives.

2020 

On March 25, 2020, Jones filed to run again in the Democratic primary for Michigan's 13th congressional district against Tlaib. Tlaib was considered possibly vulnerable to a primary challenge, due to her status as a democratic socialist, divisive rhetoric and attacks made on many popular national Democrats. For example, Tlaib booed former Secretary of State and 2016 Democratic Nominee Hillary Clinton. However, Jones’ campaign was wracked by allegations of financial misconduct. On April 2, Jones announced that she had tested positive for COVID-19. Jones decisively lost the primary election to Tlaib 66%-34% on August 4. The margin of Jones's loss was considered to be large.

Electoral history

See also
 David Curson, elected in a similar situation
 List of African-American United States representatives
 Women in the United States House of Representatives

References

External links

Government website
Campaign website

1959 births
21st-century American politicians
21st-century American women politicians
African-American members of the United States House of Representatives
African-American people in Michigan politics
African-American women in politics
Democratic Party members of the United States House of Representatives from Michigan
Detroit City Council members
Female members of the United States House of Representatives
Living people
Politicians from Birmingham, Alabama
Wayne State University alumni
Women city councillors in Michigan
African-American city council members in Michigan
21st-century African-American women
21st-century African-American politicians
20th-century African-American people
20th-century African-American women